The Italian front, Alpine front ("Alpine front"; in , "Mountain war") involved a series of battles at the border between Austria-Hungary and Italy, fought between 1915 and 1918 in the course of World War I. Following secret promises made by the Allies in the 1915 Treaty of London, Italy entered the war aiming to annex the Austrian Littoral, northern Dalmatia, and the territories of present-day Trentino and South Tyrol. Although Italy had hoped to gain the territories with a surprise offensive, the front soon bogged down into trench warfare, similar to that on the Western Front in France, but at high altitudes and with very cold winters. Fighting along the front displaced much of the local population, and several thousand civilians died from malnutrition and illness in Italian and Austro-Hungarian refugee camps. The Allied victory at Vittorio Veneto, the disintegration of the Habsburg empire, and the Italian capture of Trento and Trieste ended the military operations in November 1918. The armistice of Villa Giusti entered into force on 4 November 1918, while Austria-Hungary no longer existed as a unified entity. Italy also refers to the Great War as the Fourth Italian War of Independence, which completed the last stage of Italian unification.

History

Pre-war period

While being a member of the Triple Alliance which consisted of Italy, Austria-Hungary and Germany, Italy did not declare war in August 1914, arguing that the Triple Alliance was defensive in nature and therefore Austria-Hungary's aggression did not oblige Italy to take part. Moreover, Austria-Hungary omitted to consult Italy before sending the ultimatum to Serbia and refused to discuss compensation due according to article 7 of the Alliance. Italy had a longstanding rivalry with Austria-Hungary, dating back to the Congress of Vienna in 1815 after the Napoleonic Wars, which granted several regions on the Italian peninsula to the Austrian Empire.

More importantly, a radical nationalist political movement, called Unredeemed Italy (Italia irredenta), founded in the 1880s, started claiming the Italian-inhabited territories of Austria-Hungary, especially in the Austrian Littoral and in the County of Tyrol. By the 1910s, the expansionist ideas of this movement were taken up by a significant part of the Italian political elite. The annexation of those Austro-Hungarian territories that were inhabited by Italians became the main Italian war goal, assuming a similar function to the issue of Alsace-Lorraine for the French. However, of around 1.5 million people living in those areas, 45% were Italian speakers, while the rest were Slovenes, Germans and Croats. In northern Dalmatia, which was also among the Italian war aims, the Italian-speaking population was only around 5%.

In the early stages of the war, Allied diplomats secretly courted Italy, attempting to secure Italian participation on the Allied side. Set up between the British Foreign Secretary Edward Grey, the Italian Foreign Minister Sidney Sonnino and the French Foreign Minister Jules Cambon, Italy's entry was finally engineered by the Treaty of London of 26 April 1915, in which Italy renounced her obligations to the Triple Alliance.

On 23 May, Italy declared war on Austria-Hungary.

Campaigns of 1915–1916

During the Italo-Turkish War in Libya (1911–1912), the Italian military suffered equipment and munition shortages not yet repaired before Italian entry into the Great War. At the opening of the campaign, Austro-Hungarian troops occupied and fortified high ground of the Julian Alps and Karst Plateau, but the Italians initially outnumbered their opponents three-to-one.

Battles of Isonzo in 1915

An Italian offensive aimed to cross the Soča (Isonzo) river, take the fortress town of Gorizia, and then enter the Karst Plateau.  This offensive opened the first Battles of the Isonzo.

At the beginning of the First Battle of the Isonzo on 23 June 1915, Italian forces outnumbered the Austrians three-to-one but failed to penetrate the strong Austro-Hungarian defensive lines in the highlands of northwestern Gorizia and Gradisca.  Because the Austrian forces occupied higher ground, Italians conducted difficult offensives while climbing.  The Italian forces therefore failed to drive much beyond the river, and the battle ended on 7 July 1915.

Despite a professional officer corps, severely under-equipped Italian units lacked morale. Also many troops deeply disliked the newly appointed Italian commander, general Luigi Cadorna. Moreover, preexisting equipment and munition shortages slowed progress and frustrated all expectations for a "Napoleonic style" breakout. Like most contemporaneous militaries, the Italian army primarily used horses for transport but struggled and sometimes failed to supply the troops sufficiently in the tough terrain.

Two weeks later on 18 July 1915, the Italians attempted another frontal assault against the Austro-Hungarian trench lines with more artillery in the Second Battle of the Isonzo. In the northern section of the front, the Italians managed to overrun Mount Batognica over Kobarid (Caporetto), which would have an important strategic value in future battles. This bloody offensive concluded in stalemate when both sides ran out of ammunition.

The Italians recuperated, rearmed with 1200 heavy guns, and then on 18 October 1915 launched the Third Battle of the Isonzo, another attack. Forces of Austria-Hungary repulsed this Italian offensive, which concluded on 4 November without resulting gains.

The Italians again launched another offensive on 10 November, the Fourth Battle of the Isonzo. Both sides suffered more casualties, but the Italians conquered important entrenchments, and the battle ended on 2 December for exhaustion of armaments, but occasional skirmishing persisted.

After the winter lull, the Italians launched the Fifth Battle of the Isonzo on 9 March 1916, and captured the strategic Mount Sabatino. But Austria-Hungary repulsed all other attacks, and the battle concluded on 16 March in poor weather for trench warfare.

The Asiago offensive
Following Italy's stalemate, the Austro-Hungarian forces began planning a counteroffensive (Battle of Asiago) in Trentino and directed over the plateau of Altopiano di Asiago, with the aim to break through to the Po River plain and thus cutting off the 2nd, 3rd, and 4th Italian Armies in the North East of the country. The offensive began on 15 May 1916 with 15 divisions, and resulted in initial gains, but then the Italians counterattacked and pushed the Austro-Hungarians back to the Tyrol.

Later battles for the Isonzo

Later in 1916, four more battles along the Isonzo river erupted. The Sixth Battle of the Isonzo, launched by the Italians in August, resulted in a success greater than the previous attacks. The offensive gained nothing of strategic value but did take Gorizia, which boosted Italian spirits. The Seventh, Eighth, and Ninth battles of the Isonzo (14 September – 4 November) managed to accomplish little except to wear down the already exhausted armies of both nations.

The frequency of offensives for which the Italian soldiers partook between May 1915 and August 1917, one every three months, was higher than demanded by the armies on the Western Front. Italian discipline was also harsher, with punishments for infractions of duty of a severity not known in the German, French, and British armies.

Shellfire in the rocky terrain caused 70% more casualties per rounds expended than on the soft ground in Belgium and France. By the autumn of 1917 the Italian army had suffered most of the deaths it was to incur during the war, yet the end of the war seemed to still be an eternity away. This was not the same line of thought for the Austro-Hungarians. On 25 August, the Emperor Charles wrote to the Kaiser the following: "The experience we have acquired in the eleventh battle has led me to believe that we should fare far worse in the twelfth. My commanders and brave troops have decided that such an unfortunate situation might be anticipated by an offensive. We have not the necessary means as regards troops."

Tunnel warfare in the mountains

From 1915, the high peaks of the Dolomites range were an area of fierce mountain warfare. In order to protect their soldiers from enemy fire and the hostile alpine environment, both Austro-Hungarian and Italian military engineers constructed fighting tunnels which offered a degree of cover and allowed better logistics support. Working at high altitudes in the hard carbonate rock of the Dolomites, often in exposed areas near mountain peaks and even in glacial ice, required extreme skill of both Austro-Hungarian and Italian miners.

Beginning on the 13th, later referred to as White Friday, December 1916 would see 10,000 soldiers on both sides killed by avalanches in the Dolomites. Numerous avalanches were caused by the Italians and Austro-Hungarians purposefully firing artillery shells on the mountainside, while others were naturally caused.

In addition to building underground shelters and covered supply routes for their soldiers like the Italian Strada delle 52 Gallerie, both sides also attempted to break the stalemate of trench warfare by tunneling under no man's land and placing explosive charges beneath the enemy's positions. Between 1 January 1916 and 13 March 1918, Austro-Hungarian and Italian units fired a total of 34 mines in this theatre of the war. Focal points of the underground fighting were Pasubio with 10 mines, Lagazuoi with 5, Col di Lana/Monte Sief also with 5, and Marmolada with 4 mines. In April 1916, the Italians detonated explosives under the peaks of Col Di Lana, killing numerous Austro-Hungarians.

1917: Germany arrives on the front

The Italians directed a two-pronged attack against the Austrian lines north and east of Gorizia. The Austrians checked the advance east, but Italian forces under Luigi Capello managed to break the Austrian lines and capture the Banjšice Plateau. Characteristic of nearly every other theater of the war, the Italians found themselves on the verge of victory but could not secure it because their supply lines could not keep up with the front-line troops and they were forced to withdraw. However, the Italians despite suffering heavy casualties had almost exhausted and defeated the Austro-Hungarian army on the front, forcing them to call in German help for the much anticipated Caporetto Offensive.

The Austro-Hungarians received desperately needed reinforcements after the Eleventh Battle of the Isonzo from German Army soldiers rushed in after the Russian offensive ordered by Kerensky of July 1917 failed. Also arrived German troops from Romanian front after the Battle of Mărășești. The Germans introduced infiltration tactics to the Austro-Hungarian front and helped work on a new offensive. Meanwhile, mutinies and plummeting morale crippled the Italian Army from within. The soldiers lived in poor conditions and engaged in attack after attack that often yielded minimal or no military gain.

On 24 October 1917 the Austro-Hungarians and Germans launched the Battle of Caporetto (Italian name for Kobarid or Karfreit in German). Chlorine-arsenic agent and diphosgene gas shells were fired as part of a huge artillery barrage, followed by infantry using infiltration tactics, bypassing enemy strong points and attacking on the Italian rear. At the end of the first day, the Italians had retreated  to the Tagliamento River.

When the Austro-Hungarian offensive routed the Italians, the new Italian chief of staff, Armando Diaz ordered to stop their retreat and defend the fortified defenses around the Monte Grappa summit  between the Roncone and the Tomatico mountains; although numerically inferior (51,000 against 120,000) the Italian Army managed to halt the Austro-Hungarian and German armies in the First Battle of Monte Grappa.

1918: The war ends

Second Battle of the Piave River (June 1918)

Advancing deep and fast, the Austro-Hungarians outran their supply lines, which forced them to stop and regroup. The Italians, pushed back to defensive lines near Venice on the Piave River, had suffered 600,000 casualties to this point in the war. Because of these losses, the Italian Government called to arms the so-called 99 Boys (Ragazzi del '99); the new class of conscripts born in 1899 who were turning 18 in 1917. In November 1917, British and French troops started to bolster the front line, from the 5 and 6 divisions respectively provided. Far more decisive to the war effort than their troops was the Allies economic assistance by providing strategic materials (steel, coal and crops – provided by the British but imported from Argentina – etc.), which Italy always lacked sorely. In the spring of 1918, Germany pulled out its troops for use in its upcoming Spring Offensive on the Western Front. As a result of the Spring Offensive, Britain and France also pulled half of their divisions back to the Western Front.

The Austro-Hungarians now began debating how to finish the war in Italy. The Austro-Hungarian generals disagreed on how to administer the final offensive. Archduke Joseph August of Austria decided for a two-pronged offensive, where it would prove impossible for the two forces to communicate in the mountains.

The Second Battle of the Piave River began with a diversionary attack near the Tonale Pass named Lawine, which the Italians repulsed after two days of fighting. Austrian deserters betrayed the objectives of the upcoming offensive, which allowed the Italians to move two armies directly in the path of the Austrian prongs. The other prong, led by general Svetozar Boroević von Bojna initially experienced success until aircraft bombed their supply lines and Italian reinforcements arrived.

The decisive Battle of Vittorio Veneto (October–November 1918)

To the disappointment of Italy's allies, no counter-offensive followed the Battle of Piave. The Italian Army had suffered huge losses in the battle, and considered an offensive dangerous. General Armando Diaz waited for more reinforcements to arrive from the Western Front. By the end of October 1918, Austro-Hungary was in a dire situation. Czechoslovakia, Croatia, and Slovenia proclaimed their independence and parts of their troops started deserting, disobeying orders and retreating. Many Czechoslovak troops, in fact, started working for the Allied Cause, and in September 1918, five Czechoslovak Regiments were formed in the Italian Army.

By October 1918, Italy finally had enough soldiers to mount an offensive. The attack targeted Vittorio Veneto, across the Piave. The Italian Army broke through a gap near Sacile and poured in reinforcements that crushed the Austro-Hungarian defensive line. On 31 October,  the Italian Army launched a full scale attack and the whole front began to collapse. On 3 November, 300,000 Austro-Hungarian soldiers surrendered, at the same day the Italians entered Trento and Trieste, greeted by the population.

On 3 November, the military leaders of the already disintegrated Austria-Hungary sent a flag of truce to the Italian commander to ask again for an armistice and terms of peace. The terms were arranged by telegraph with the Allied authorities in Paris, communicated to the Austro-Hungarian commander, and were accepted. The Armistice with Austria was signed in the Villa Giusti, near Padua, on 3 November, and took effect at three o'clock in the afternoon of 4 November. Austria and Hungary signed separate armistices following the overthrow of the Habsburg monarchy and the collapse of the Austro-Hungarian Empire.

Casualties
Italian military deaths numbered 834 senior officers and generals, 16,872 junior officers, 16,302 non-commissioned officers, and 497,103 enlisted men, for a total of over 531,000 dead. Of these, 257,418 men came from Northern Italy, 117,480 from Central Italy, and 156,251 from Southern Italy.

Austro-Hungarian KIAs (this category does not include soldiers who perished in the rear or as POWs) amounted to 4,538 officers and 150,812 soldiers, for a total of 155,350 dead. The losses were increasing over time; there were 31,135 killed in 1915, 38,519 in 1916, 42,309 in 1917 and 43,387 in 1918. 
While the KIA numbers of Italian soldiers on the Italian front in 1915 were 66,090 killed , in 1916 this figure was 118,880 killed, in 1917 it was 152,790 killed, and in 1918 it stood at 40,250 killed soldiers.

Occupation of northern Dalmatia and Tyrol
By the end of hostilities in November 1918, the Italian military had seized control of the entire portion of Dalmatia that had been guaranteed to Italy by the London Pact. From 5–6 November 1918, Italian forces were reported to have reached Lissa, Lagosta, Sebenico, and other localities on the Dalmatian coast. In 1918, Admiral Enrico Millo declared himself Italy's Governor of Dalmatia. After 4 November the Italian military occupied also Innsbruck and all Tyrol by 20–22,000 soldiers of the III Corps of the First Army.

Italian Army Order of Battle as of 24 May 1915

First Army
Lieutenant General Roberto Brusati

III Corps 
Lieutenant General Vittorio Camerana
 5th Infantry Division (Lieutenant General Luigi Druetti)
 "Cuneo" Brigade – 7th (I, III & IV) and 8th (I-III) Infantry Regiments
 "Palermo" Brigade – 67th (I-III) and 68th (I, III & IV) Infantry Regiments
 27th Field Artillery Regiment (-) (5 batteries) 75/906 (arr. 7–13 June); 10th Co, 2nd Sapper Regiment
 6th Infantry Division (Lieutenant General Oscar Roffi)
 "Toscana" Brigade – 77th (I-III) and 78th (I-III) Infantry Regiments
 "Sicilia" Brigade – 61st (I-III) and 62nd (I-III) Infantry Regiments
 16th Field Artillery Regiment (8 batteries) 75/906; 11th Co, 2nd Sapper Regiment
 35th Infantry Division (Lieutenant General Felice De Chaurand)
 "Milano" Brigade – 159th (I-III) and 160th (I-III) Infantry Regiments
 "Novara" Brigade—153rd I-III) and 154th (I-III) Infantry Regiments
 42nd Field Artillery Regiment (6 batteries) 75/906; 15th Co, 1st Sapper Regiment; 5th Group of mobile militia cavalry (9th & 10th Squadrons)
 Corps Troops
 7th Bersaglieri Regiment (Btns 8, 10 & 11 bis)
 45th Bersaglieri Battalion (mobile militia)
 Mixed Regular & Mobile Militia Alpini battalions: Morbegno (44, 45, 47, 88, 104 Cos); Tirano (46, 48, 49, 89, 113 Cos); Edolo (50–52, 90, 105 Cos) and Vestone (53–55, 91 Cos)
 Territorial Militia Alpini battalions: Val d’Intelvi (244, 245, 247 Cos); Valtellina (246, 248, 249 Cos); Val Camonica (250-52 Cos) and Val Chiese (253-54 Cos)
 III Battalion, Royal Customs Guards (Frontier) (Reale Guardia di Finanza di frontiers)
 27th Light Cavalry Regiment of Aquila (4 squadrons) (arr. 20 May)
 6th Field Artillery Regiment (8 batteries) 75/906
 30th Mountain Battery
 2nd Group, 1st Heavy Field Artillery Regiment (4th & 5th batteries)
 1st Battalion, Miners (Cos 10, 11, 18)
 4th Telegraph Co
 ½ 18th Co, 2nd Sapper Regiment

V Corps
source:
Lieutenant General Florenzio Aliprindi
 9th Infantry Division (Lieutenant General Ferruccio Ferri)
 "Roma" Brigade—79th (II, III, IV) and 80th (I-III) Infantry Regiments
 "Pugile" Brigade—71st (II-IV) and 72nd (I-III) Infantry Regiments
 29th Field Artillery Regiment (8 batteries) 75/906; 12th Co, 1st Sapper Regiment
 15th Infantry Division (Lieutenant General Luigi Lenchantin)
 "Venezia" Brigade—83rd (I-III) and 84th (I, II, IV) Infantry Regiments
 "Abruzzi" Brigade—57th (I, III, IV) and 58th (I-III) Infantry Regiments
 19th Field Artillery Regiment (-) (6 batteries) 75/906; 1st Co, 2nd Sapper Regiment
 34th Infantry Division (Lieutenant General Pasquale Oro)
 "Ivrea" Brigade—161st (I-III) and 162nd (I-III) Infantry Regiments
 "Treviso" Brigade—115th (I-III) and 116th (I-III) Infantry Regiments
 41st Field Artillery Regiment (6 batteries) 75/906; 9th Co, 2nd Sapper Regiment; Mobile Militia cavalry: 21st Squadron (arr. 11 June) & 23rd Squadron (arr. 29 June)
 Corps Troops
 2nd Bersaglieri Regiment (Btns 2 bis, 4 & 17)
 4th Bersaglieri Regiment (Btns 26 bis, 29 & 31 bis)
 8th Bersaglieri Regiment (Btns 3 bis, 5 & 12)
 41st, 42nd and 48th Bersaglieri Battalions (mobile militia)
 Mixed Regular & Mobile Militia Alpini battalions: Verona (56–58, 73, 92 Cos); Vincenza (59–61, 93, 108 Cos); Bassano (77–79, 106 Cos) and Feltre (64–66, 95 Cos)
 Territorial Militia Alpini battalions: Val d’Adige (256–258 Cos); Val Leogra (259, 260 Cos); Val Brenta (262, 263 Cos) and Val Cismon (264, 265 Cos)
  V, VII, IX, XVII & XVIII Battalions, Royal Customs Guards (Coastal) (Reale Guardia di Finanza di costieri) with Autonomous Cos. 11 and 52
 I Battalion, Royal Custom Guards (Frontier)
 22nd Light Cavalry Regiment of Catania (arr. 28 May)
 15 batteries of mountain artillery: Oneglia Group (batteries 23, 26 & 27); Vincenza Group (batteries 19–21); Genove Group (batteries 28 & 29); Torino Aosta Group (batteries 4–6) and Independent batteries: 1, 8, 57 & 59
 5th Field Artillery Regiment (8 batteries) 75/911
 1st, 13th, 14th & ½ 7th Cos, Miners
 11th Telegraph Co
 16th Co, 2nd Sapper Regiment (barrier Brenta-Cismon)
 16th Co, 1st Sapper Regiment (barrier Agno-Assa)

Army Troops
 “Mantova” Brigade—113th (I-III) and 114th Infantry (I-III) Regiments
 4th Squadron, 27th Light Cavalry Regiment of Aquila
 3rd Group, 1st Heavy Field Artillery Regiment (6th & 7th batteries)
 2nd & 17th Cos, Miners
 17th Co, 2nd Sapper Regiment
 14th Pontoon Co
 16th Telegraph Co
 1 section, radiotelegraph of 1 ½ Kw
 1 squad, telephotography

Second Army
Lieutenant General Pietro Frugoni

II Corps
Lieutenant General Enzio Reisoli
 3rd Division (Lieutenant General Giovanni Prelli)
 "Ravenna" Brigade – 37th (I, III, IV) & 38th (I-III) Infantry Regiments
 "Forli Brigade" – 43rd (I-III) & 44th (I, III, IV) Infantry Regiments
 23rd Field Artillery Regiment (8 batteries) 75/906; 2nd Co, 2nd Sapper Regiment
 4th Division (Major General Cesare Del Mastro)
 "Livorno" Brigade – 33rd (I-III) & 34th (IV-VI) Infantry Regiments
 "Lombardia" Brigade – 73rd (I-III) & 74th (I-III) Infantry Regiments
 26th Field Artillery Regiment (8 batteries) 75/906; 3rd Co, 2nd Sapper Regiment
 32nd Division (Lieutenant General Alberto Piacentini)
 "Spezia" Brigade – 125th (I-III) & 126th (I-III) Infantry Regiments
 "Firenza" Brigade – 127th (I-III) & 128th (I-III) Infantry Regiments
 48th Field Artillery Regiment (6 batteries) 75/906; 13th Co, 2nd Sapper Regiment
 Corps Troops
 9th & 10th Bersaglieri Cyclist Battalions
 11th Field Artillery Regiment (8 batteries) 75/911
 6th Group, 1st Heavy Field Artillery Regiment (13th & 14th batteries)
 6th Telegraph Co

IV Corps
source:
Lieutenant General Mario Nicolis de Robilant
 7th Division (Lieutenant General Nicola D'Avanzo)
 "Bergamo" Brigade – 25th (I-III) & 26th (II-IV) Infantry Regiments
 "Valtellina" Brigade – 65th (I-III) & 66th (I-III) Infantry Regiments
 21st Field Artillery Regiment (8 batteries) 75/911; 1st Co, 1st Sapper Regiment
 8th Division (Lieutenant General Guglielmo Lang)
 "Modena" Brigade – 41st (I-III) & 42nd (I, II, IV) Infantry Regiments
 "Salerno" Brigade – 89th (I, III, IV) & 90th (I-III) Infantry Regiments
 28th Field Artillery Regiment (8 batteries) 75/906
 33rd Division (Lieutenant General Carlo Ricci)
 "Liguria" Brigade – 157th (I-III) & 158th (I-III) Infantry Regiments
 "Emilia" Brigade – 119th (I-III) & 120th (I-III) Infantry Regiments
 40th Field Artillery Regiment (6 batteries) 75/906; 14th Co, 1st Sapper Regiment
 Bersaglieri Division (Lieutenant General Alessandro Raspi)
 6th Bersaglieri Regiment (Btns 6, 13 & 19)
 9th Bersaglieri Regiment (Btns 28, 30 & 32)
 11th Bersaglieri Regiment (Btns 15 bis, 27 & 33)
 12th Bersaglieri Regiment (Btns 21, 23 & 26)
 Mondavi Group Mountain Artillery (Mt batteries 10, 11, 12, 54); 17th Co, 1st Sapper Regiment
 Alpini Group A (Colonel Riccardo Tedeschi)
 Regular & Mobile Militia Alpini Battalions: Aosta (41–43 Reg Cos, 87, 103 MM Cos); Ivrea (38–40, 86, 111 Cos); Intra (7, 24, 37, 112 Cos) & Cividale (16, 20, 76, 87, 103 Cos)
 Territorial Militia Alpini battalions: Val Natisone (216, 220 Cos); Val Orco (238, 239 Cos); Val Baltea (241, 242 Cos) & Val Toce (207, 243 Cos)
 Bergamo Group Mountain Artillery (Mt batteries 31, 32, 33, 61)
 Alpini Group B (Colonel Ernesto Alliana)
 Regular & Mobile Militia Alpini Battalions: Pinerolo (25–27, 82 Cos); Susa (34–36, 85, 102 Cos); Exilles (31–33, 84 Cos) & Val Pellice (41–43, 87, 103 Cos)
 Territorial Militia Alpini Battalions: Val Cenischia (234, 235 Cos) &Val Dora (231, 232 Cos)
 Pinerola Group Mountain Artillery (Mt batteries 7 & 9)
 Corps Troops
 5th Bersaglieri Regiment (Btns 14, 22 bis, 24) with 5th Bersaglieri Cyclist Battalion
 4th Field Artillery Regiment (8 batteries) 75/911
 4th Group, 1st Heavy Field Artillery Regiment (batteries 8, 9 & 10)
 17th Telegraph Co

XII Corps
source:
Lieutenant General Luigi Segato
 23rd Division (Lieutenant General Giovanni Airaldi)
 "Verona" Brigade – 85th (I-III) & 86th (I, III, IV; 9 cos only) Infantry Regiments
 "Aosta" Brigade – 5th Infantry Regiment (II-IV; 9 cos only) &6th (I, III, IV) Infantry Regiments
 22nd Field Artillery Regiment (8 batteries) 75/906
 1st Group, 10th Field Artillery Regiment (batteries 1, 2 & 3)
 12th Co, 2nd Sapper Regiment
 24th Division (Major General Gustavo Fara)
 "Napoli" Brigade – 75th (I, II, IV; 9 cos only) &76th (I-III) Infantry Regiments
 "Piemonte" Brigade – 3rd (II, III, IV; 9 cos only) & 4th (I, II, IV) Infantry Regiments
 36th Field Artillery Regiment (2 groups w 5 field batteries) 75/911 plus 3 (sic 6?) mt. batteries: 13th Mt Group (Mt batteries 37–39) & 14th Mt. Group (Mt batteries 63, 64 & 65)
 3rd Group, 10th Field Artillery Regiment (batteries 6, 7 & 8); 4th Co, 2nd Sapper Regiment
 Corps Troops
 10th bis Bersaglieri Regiment (Btns 16 bis, 34 bis & 35 bis)
 2nd Group, 10th Field Artillery Regiment (batteries 4 & 5)
 4th Group, 2d Heavy Field Artillery Regiment (batteries 8, 9 & 10)
 9th Telegraph Co

Army Troops
 2 groups of 2 batteries of 149 A cannon (149 A batteries 1, 7, 11 & 12) (for the “first bound forward”)
 1 group of 3 batteries of 149 G cannon (149 G batteries 5, 6 & 7) (for the “first bound forward”)
 2 groups of 4 batteries of pack 70 A cannon. (pack batteries 1, 4, 5, 8, 9, 10, 11 & 20)
 1 Pontoon battalion (Cos 6, 7, 8, 13)
 8th Co, Miners
 24th Telegraph Co
 1 section radiotelegraph of 1 ½ Kw
 1 squad field photography
 3 sections of field aerostatic balloons
 3 squadrons of aeroplanes (Nos 6th, 7th & 8th Newport)

Third Army
source:
His Royal Highness, Prince Emanuele Filiberto, Duke of Aosta

VI Corps
source:
Lieutenant General Carlo Ruelle
 11th Division (Lieutenant General Ettore Mambretti)
 "Pistoia" Brigade – 35th (I, III, IV) & 36th (I-III) Infantry Regiments
 The King's ("Re") Brigade – 1st (I-III) & 2nd (I-III) Infantry Regiments
 14th Field Artillery Regiment (8 batteries) 75/906 (3 batteries arr. 27 May)
 1 group of 3 batteries of 70 A. pack (pack batteries 2, 7 & 14)
 1st Group, 1st Heavy Artillery Regiment (byts 1, 2 & 3)
 6th Co, 2nd Sapper Regiment
 12th Division (Major General Oreste Zavattari)
 "Casale" Brigade – 11th (I-III) & 12th (I-III) Infantry Regiments
 "Pavia" Brigade – 27th (I-III) & 28th (I-III) Infantry Regiments
 30th Field Artillery Regiment (8 batteries) 75/906; 7th Co, 2nd Sapper Regiment
 1st Cavalry Division (Lieutenant General Nicola Pirozzi)
 1st Cavalry Brigade – 13th Light Cavalry Regiment of Monferrato (-) (4 squadrons) (arr. 10 May) & 20th Light Cavalry Regiment of Rome (arr. 10 May)
 2nd Cavalry Brigade – 4th Cavalry Regiment of Genova (arr. 10 May) & 5th Lancer Regiment of Novara (arr. 12 May)
 94th Infantry Regiment [from Messina Brigade, 13th Division, VII Corps]
 1 battalion of 20th Infantry Regiment
 8th & 11th Bersagliari Cyclist Battalions
 2nd Group of Horse Artillery (Horse Artillery batteries 1 & 2) 75/912
 2nd Group, 3rd Field Artillery Regiment (batteries 4 & 5)
 Corps Troops
 6th & 12th Bersaglieri Cyclist Battalions
 II Battalion, Royal Customs Corps (Frontier)
 3rd Field Artillery Regiment (-) (6 batteries) 75/911
 2nd Group, 2nd Heavy Field Artillery Regiment (4th & 5th batteries)
 8th Telegraph Co
 ½ 18th Co, 2nd Sapper Regiment
 19th Co, Miners
 12th Pontoon Co
 1st & 2nd Squadrons aeroplanes Bleriot

VII Corps
source:
Lieutenant General Vincenzo Garioni
 13th Division (Lieutenant General Cleto Angelotti)
 "Messina" Brigade – 93rd (III, IV, V; 9 cos only); [94th Infantry Regiment (II-IV)]
 Sardinia Grenadiers – 1st (I, II, IV) & 2nd (I-III) Grenadier Regiments
 31st Field Artillery Regiment (8 batteries) (not arrived by 24 May)
 1 battery of 70 A. pack (pack battery 12)
 2nd Co, 1st Sapper Regiment
 14th Division (Major General Giacinto Rostagno)
 "Pinerolo" Brigade – 13th (I-III) & 14th (I, II, IV) Infantry Regiments
 "Acqui" Brigade – 17th (I, III, IV) & 18th (I-III) Infantry Regiments
 18th Field Artillery Regiment (8 batteries) 75/906 (arr. 28 May); 7th Co, 1st Sapper Regiment
 Corps Troops
 2nd Field Artillery Regiment (8 batteries) 75/911 (not arrived by 24 May)
 13th Telegraph Co (not arrived by 24 May)

XI Corps
Main Source:
Lieutenant General Giorgio Cigliana
 21st Division (Lieutenant General Carlo Mazzoli)
 The Queen's ("Regina") Brigade (not arrived by 24 May) – 9th Infantry Regiment (I-III)
 "Pisa" Brigade (not arrived by 24 May) – 29th (II-IV; 9 cos only) & 30th (I, III, IV) Infantry Regiments
 35th Field Artillery Regiment (8 batteries) 75/911 (arr. 28–30 May); 4th Co, 1st Sapper Regiment (not arrived by 24 May)
 22nd Division (Lieutenant General Vittorio Signorile)
 "Brescia" Brigade (not arrived by 24 May) – 19th (I, II, IV; 9 cos only) & 20th (I-III) Infantry Regiments
 "Ferrara" Brigade (not arrived by 24 May) – 47th (II, III, IV; 9 cos only) & 48th (I, II, IV) Infantry Regiments
 15th Field Artillery Regiment (8 batteries) 75/911 (arr. 28 May); 3rd Co, 1st Sapper Regiment (not arrived by 24 May)
 2nd Cavalry Division (or Detachment of San Giorgio di Nogaro) (Lieutenant General Giovanni Vercellana)
 HQ of the Queen's Brigade
 3rd Cavalry Brigade – 7th Lancer Regiment of Milano (arr. 16 May) & 10th Lancer Regiment of Victor Emanuel II (arr. 21 May)
 4th Cavalry Brigade – 6th Lancer Regiment of Aosta (arr. 9 June) & 25th Lancer Regiment of Mantova (arr. 30 May)
 3rd & 7th Bersagliari Cyclist Battalions
 10th Infantry Regiment (I-III)
 1 battalion of 14th Infantry Regiment
 1 battalion of 1st Grenadiers
 1st Group of Horse Artillery (Horse Artillery batteries 1 & 2) 75/912
 3rd Group, 2nd Heavy Field Artillery Regiment (batteries 6 & 7)
 2 pack batteries (pack batteries 16 & 17)
 Corps Troops
 9th Field Artillery Regiment (8 batteries) 75/911 (arr. 30 May)
 5th Pontoon Co (not arrived by 24 May)
 10th Telegraph Co (not arrived by 24 May)

Army Troops
 X, XI, XII, XIII, XIV, XV Battalions, Royal Customs Guards (Coastal)
 1st Group, 2nd Heavy Field Artillery Regiment (1, 2 & 3 batteries)
 1 group of 4 batteries of 149 G cannon (149 G batteries 1–4)
 1 battery of pack cannon of 70 A. (pack battery 19)
 5th Co, Miners
 21st Telegraph Co
 4th, 10th & 11th Pontoon Cos
 1 section radiotelegraph
 1 squad field photography
 3 sections of field aerostatic balloons
 5 squadrons of aeroplanes (Nos 1st, 2nd, 3rd, 13th & 14th Bleriot)

Fourth Army
source:
Lieutenant General Luigi Nava

I Corps
Lieutenant General Ottavio Ragni
 1st Division (Lieutenant General Alfonso Pettiti di Roreto)
 "Parma" Brigade – 49th (I-III) &50th (I, IV & V; 9 cos only) Infantry Regiments
 "Basilicata" Brigade – 91st (I-III) & 92nd (I-III) Infantry Regiments
 25th Field Artillery Regiment (-) (5 batteries) 75/906 (arr. 1 June)
 2 batteries of 70 A. pack (pack batteries 6 & 13) (arr. 20 June)
 5th Co, 2nd Sapper Regiment
 2nd Division (Lieutenant General Saverio Nasalli Rocca)
 "Como" Brigade – 23rd (I, IV & V; 9 cos only) & 24th (I-III) Infantry Regiments
 "Umbria" Brigade – 53rd (I-III) & 54th (I-III) Infantry Regiments
 17th Field Artillery Regiment (8 batteries) 75/906
 10th Division (Lieutenant General Giovanni Scrivante)
 "Marche" Brigade – 55th (I-III) & 56th (I-III) Infantry Regiments
 "Ancona" Brigade – 69th (I-III) & 70th (I-III) Infantry Regiments
 20th Field Artillery Regiment (8 batteries) 75/906; 11th Co, 1st Sapper Regiment; 14th Co, 2nd Sapper Regiment
 Corps Troops
 21st Light Cavalry Regiment of Padova (arr. 30 May)
 8th Field Artillery Regiment (8 batteries) 75/906
 ½ 7th & 21st Cos, Miners
 12th Telegraph Co

IX Corps
Lieutenant General Pietro Marini
 17th Division (Lieutenant General Diomede Saveri)
 "Reggio" Brigade – 45th (I-III) & 46th (I-III) Infantry Regiments
 "Torino" Brigade – 81st (I-III) & 82nd (IV-VI; 9 cos only) Infantry Regiments
 13th Field Artillery Regiment (8 batteries) 75/911 (arr. 31 May); 5th Co, 1st Sapper Regiment
 18th Division (Lieutenant General Vittorio Carpi)
 "Alpi" Brigade – 51st (I-III) & 52nd (II-IV) Infantry Regiments
 "Calabria" Brigade – 59th (I-III) & 60th (II-IV) Infantry Regiments
 33rd Field Artillery Regiment (8 batteries) 75/911; 8th Co, 1st Sapper Regiment
 Additional Organic
 Mixed Regular & Mobile Militia Alpini Battalions – Fenestrelle (28, 29, 30, 83 Cos); Pieve di Cadore (67, 68, 75, 96 Cos) & Belluno (77–79, 106 Cos)
 Territorial Militia Alpini Battalions – Val Chisone (228–230 Cos); Val Piave (267 & 268 Cos) & Val Cordevole (206 & 266 Cos)
 Torino-Susa Group of Mt. Artillery (Mt batteries 2 & 3)
 Belluno Group of Mt. Artillery (Mt batteries 22, 23, 24, & 58)
 Como Group of Mt. Artillery (Mt batteries 34, 35 & 36)
 Corps Troops
 3rd Bersaglieri Regiment (Btns 18, 20 & 25)
 9th Lancer Regiment of Firenza (arr. 5 June)
 1st Field Artillery Regiment (8 batteries) 75/911 (2 batteries arr. 26 May)
 5th Telegraph Co

Army Troops
 XVI Battalion, Royal Custom Guards (Frontier)
 1 regiment of mobile territorial infantry (3 battalions)
 5th & 6th Groups, 2nd Heavy Field Artillery Regiment (batteries 11, 12, 13 & 14)
 1 battalion of Miners (12, 16, 20 & 21 Cos)
 22nd Telegraph Co
 1st Pontoon Co
 1 section radiotelegraph
 1 squad telephotography

Carnia Zone
source:
Lieutenant General Clemente Lequio
 8 Mixed Regular & Mobile Militia Alpini battalions: Mondovi (9-11, 114 Cos); Pieve di Teco (2, 3, 8, 107, 115 Cos); Ceva (1, 4 & 5, 98, 116 Cos); Borgo San Dalmazzo (13–15, 99, 117 Cos); Dronero (17–19, 81, 101 Cos); Saluzzo (21–23, 80, 100 Cos); Tolmezzo (6, 12, 72, 109 Cos) & Gemona (69–71, 97 Cos)
 8 Territorial Militia Alpini battalions: Val d’Eilero (209, 210 cos); Val d’ Arroscia (202, 203, 208 Cos); Val Tanaro (201, 204 cos); Valle Stura (213–215 cos); Val Maira (217–219 cos); Val Varaita (221–223 cos); Val Tagliamento (212 & 272 cos) & Val Fella (269 & 270 cos)
 VIII, XIX & XX Battalions, Royal Customs Guards (Coastal)
 1 squadron, 13th Light Cavalry Regiment of Monferrato
 6 batteries of mountain artillery: Mt batteries 13, 14, 15 & 55 (Conegliano Group); Mt battery 51 (Torino-Susa Group) & Mt battery 52 (Torino-Aosta Group)
 2 batteries of 70 A. pack (pack batteries 3 & 15)
 4th & 6th Cos, Miners
 6th & 21st Cos 1st Sapper Regiment
 19th Telegraph Co

High Command Troops
source:

VIII Corps
source:
Lieutenant General Ottavio Briccola
 16th Division (Major General Luciano Secco)
 "Friuli" Brigade – 87th (I bis, II bis, III bis; 9 cos only) & 88th (I-III) Infantry Regiments
 "Cremona" Brigade – 21st (I-III) & 22nd (I, III, IV) Infantry Regiments
 32nd Field Artillery Regiment (8 batteries) 75/906 (arr. 29 May); 8th Co, 2nd Sapper Regiment
 29th Division (Lieutenant General Fortunato Marazzi)
 "Perugia" Brigade – 129th (I-III) & 130th (I-III) Infantry Regiments
 "Lazio" Brigade – 131st (I-III) & 132nd (I-III) Infantry Regiments
 37th Field Artillery Regiment (6 batteries) 75/906 (arr. 31 May); Special Co, 2nd Sapper Regiment
 Corps Troops
 23rd Light Cavalry Regiment of Umberto I
 7th Field Artillery Regiment (8 batteries) (arr. Early June) 75/911
 14th Telegraph Co

X Corps
source:
Lieutenant General Domenico Grandi
 19th Division (Lieutenant General Giuseppe Ciancio)
 "Siena" Brigade – 31st (I, III, IV) & 32nd (I-III) Infantry Regiments
 "Palermo" Brigade – 39th (I-III) & 40th (I, II, IV) Infantry Regiments
 24th Field Artillery Regiment (8 batteries) 75/906 (arr. 5–9 June)
 9th Co, 1st Sapper Regiment
 20th Division (Lieutenant General Eduardo Coardi di Carpenetto)
 "Savona" Brigade – 15th (I-III) & 16th (II bis, IV & V; only 9 cos) Infantry Regiments
 "Cagliari" Brigade – 63rd (I, II & IV) & 64th (I-III) Infantry Regiments
 34th Field Artillery Regiment (8 batteries) 75/906 (arr. 5–6 June); 10th Co, 1st Sapper Regiment
 Corps Troops
 12th Field Artillery Regiment (8 batteries) 75/911 (arr. 6–9 June)
 15th Telegraph Co

XIII Corps
source:
Lieutenant General Gaetano Zoppi
 25th Division (Major General Luigi Capello)
 "Macerata" Brigade – 121st (I-III) & 122nd (I-III) Infantry Regiments
 "Sassari" Brigade – 151st (I-III) & 152nd (I-III) Infantry Regiments
 46th Field Artillery Regiment (8 batteries) 75/906; 15th Co, 2nd Sapper Regiment
 30th Division (Lieutenant General Arcangelo Scotti)
 "Piacenza" Brigade – 159th (I-III) & 160th (I-III) Infantry Regiments
 "Alessandria" Brigade – 155th (I-III) & 156th (I-III) Infantry Regiments
 39th Field Artillery Regiment (6 batteries) 75/906 (arr. 13 June); 18th Co, 1st Sapper Regiment
 31st Division (Lieutenant General Annibale Gastaldello)
 "Chieti" Brigade – 123rd (I-III) & 124th (I-III) Infantry Regiments
 "Barletta" Brigade – 137th (I-III) & 138th (I-III) Infantry Regiments
 43rd Field Artillery Regiment (6 batteries) 75/906 (arr. 2 June)
 25th Field Artillery Regiment (3 batteries) 75/906 (arr. 1 June)
 13th Co, 1st Sapper Regiment
 Corps Troops
 49th, 50th & 52nd Bersaglieri Battalions (mobile militia)
 44th Field Artillery Regiment (6 batteries) 75/906 (arr. 8–9 June)
 5th Pontoon Co
 18th Telegraph Co

XIV Corps
source:
Lieutenant General Paolo Morrone
 26th Division (Major General Michele Salazar)
 "Caltanissetta" Brigade – 147th (I-III) & 148th (I-III) Infantry Regiments
 "Catania" Brigade – 145th (I-III) & 146th (I-III) Infantry Regiments
 49th Field Artillery Regiment (5 batteries) 75/906 (arr. 12 June)
 6th Squadron, 16th Light Cavalry Regiment of Lucca
 19th Co, 2nd Sapper Regiment
 27th Division (Lieutenant General Guglielmo Pecori Giraldi)
 "Benevento" Brigade – 133rd (I-III) & 134th (I-III) Infantry Regiments
 "Campagnia" Brigade – 135th (I-III) & 136th (I-III) Infantry Regiments
 38th Field Artillery Regiment (6 batteries) 75/906 (arr. 8 June); 20th Co, 2nd Sapper Regiment
 28th Division (Lieutenant General Giuseppe Queirolo)
 "Bari" Brigade – 139th (I-III) & 140th (I-III) Infantry Regiments
 "Catanzaro" Brigade – 141st (I-III) & 142nd (I-III) Infantry Regiments
 45th Field Artillery Regiment (6 batteries) 75/906 (arr. 9–12 June); 21st Co, 2nd Sapper Regiment
 Corps Troops
 56th Bersaglieri Battalion (mobile militia)
 47th Field Artillery Regiment (5 batteries) plus 3 batteries of 27th & 2 batteries of 19th Field Artillery Regiments; all 75/906
 30th Mountain Battery
 2nd & 9th Pontoon Cos
 23rd Telegraph Co

3rd Cavalry Division
Lieutenant General Carlo Guicciardi di Cervarolo
 5th Cavalry Brigade – 12th Light Cavalry Regiment of Saluzzo (arr. 7 June) & 24th Light Cavalry Regiment of Vincinza (arr. 20 May)
 6th Cavalry Brigade – 3rd Cavalry Regiment Savoia (arr 6 June) & 8th Lancer Regiment of Montebello (arr. 3 June)
 3rd Group Horse Artillery (Horse Artillery batteries 5 & 6) 75/912 (29 May at Ponte di Piave)

4th Cavalry Division
source:
Lieutenant General Alessandro Malingri di Bagnolo
 4th Cavalry Brigade – 1st Cavalry Regiment Nizza (arr. 5 June) & 26th Lancer Regiment of Vercelli (arr. 5 June)
 8th Cavalry Brigade – 19th Light Cavalry Regiment Guide (Squadron Nos 1, 3, 4, 5 & 6) (arr. 8 June) & 28th Light Cavalry Regiment of Treviso (arr. 7 June)
 4th Group Horse Artillery (Horse Artillery batteries 7 & 8) 75/912 (left Milano 4 June for Portogruaro)

Misc.
 "Padova" Brigade – 117th (I-III) & 118th (I-III) Infantry Regiments
 "Trappani" Brigade – 144th Infantry Regiment (I, II, III; 9 cos only) & 149th Infantry Regiment
 Royal Carabinieri Regiment of 3 battalions (9 cos)
 19th Co, 1st Sapper Regiment
 1st & 7th Telegraph Cos
 15th Co, Miners
 15th Pontoon Co
 Dirigibles P4, P5, M1
 4 squadrons aeroplanes (Nos. 4th Bleriot, 5th Newport, 9th & 10th H. Farman)

See also
 Austro-Hungarian fortifications on the Italian border
 Museum of the White War in Adamello - located in Temù, in the Upper Val Camonica.
 White War

Notes

References

Sources

 
 
 
 
 
 
 
 
 Page, Thomas Nelson (1920). Italy and the World War. New York, Charles Scribner's Sons, Full Text Available Online.
 
 

 
Austria-Hungary in World War I
Italian Campaign
Military history of Italy during World War I
Military history of the United Kingdom during World War I
World War I orders of battle